Michael Pohl (born 18 November 1989) is a German athlete. He competed in the men's 60 metres at the 2018 IAAF World Indoor Championships. In 2019, he won the bronze medal in the team event at the 2019 European Games held in Minsk, Belarus.

References

External links

1989 births
Living people
Place of birth missing (living people)
German male sprinters
Athletes (track and field) at the 2019 European Games
European Games medalists in athletics
European Games bronze medalists for Germany
German national athletics champions